Mercedes Chacón Porras (1896-1963) was the first obstetrical nurse in Costa Rica and spread health care to rural communities throughout the country. In 2002, she was one of the inaugural women inducted into La Galería de las Mujeres de Costa Rica and the first national health center named for a woman bears her name.

Biography
Mercedes Chacón Porras was born on 11 September 1896 in Costa Rica. In 1925, Chacón became the first obstetrical nurse of Costa Rica and worked toward providing prenatal care and preventing maternal and infant deaths. She was one of the few professional women working in the health field in the country and strove to bring health services to rural populations within their own communities.

Death and legacy
Chacón died on 18 April 1963 and was posthumously inducted into La Galería de las Mujeres de Costa Rica in 2002. A clinic in Aserrí, Costa Rica was named in her honor, breaking the custom of naming national health centers after men.

References

Citations

Bibliography

Further reading

1896 births
1963 deaths
Costa Rican women
Costa Rican nurses
Costa Rican women's rights activists
Costa Rican women activists
Women nurses